Angas Downs Indigenous Protected Area (IPA) is an Aboriginal Australian-owned  pastoral lease, within the MacDonnell Shire area,   south-west of Alice Springs, Northern Territory,  east from Uluṟu-Kata Tjuṯa National Park (Ayers Rock),  south-east of Kings Canyon/Watarrka National Park and  from Mount Ebenezer Roadhouse on the Lasseter Highway. The property is a pastoral lease held by the Imanpa Development Association.

It was declared and formally recognised as an Indigenous Protected Area as part of the Australian Government's Caring for Country scheme on 10 June 2009. The property forms part of Australia's National Reserve System.

Previous land management practices and other anthropogenic pressures had damaged Angas Downs, and many native species have disappeared. Preferred game and important animals are less common and feral animals and weeds pose a major challenge.

Through the support of the Australian Government's Caring for our Country, Working on Country and Indigenous Protected Areas programs, Anangu Rangers and the Imanpa community are addressing these challenges, restoring the landscape and protecting its cultural sites. Land management is based on Kuka Kanyini, "looking after game animals" and aims to increase species which aid the environment. The Rotary Club of Canberra Burley Griffin has also been providing support to the project.

Significance of Angas Downs
Angas Downs is important to the Indigenous people in the region (Anangu). As well as biodiversity value, it has significant Tjukurpa (Indigenous law and customary knowledge) places and sacred sites where ceremonies continue to occur. Today the IPA provides employment and income for the Indigenous community, creates learning and training opportunities, and improves health (through exercise and diet). It reconnects the traditional people of this area to their land and culture, instilling a sense of pride.

Natural resources

Angas Downs has rich natural and cultural resources. There are many different types of vegetation and landscapes including Mulga woodlands (Acacia aneura), gypsum depressions, limestone plains, Spinifex (Triodia spp.) sand dunes, Desert Oak (Allocasuarina decaisneana) woodlands, alluvial floodplains and quartzite hills. Angas Downs has rich bird life and is home to many species of animals and reptiles many of which are important food and totems to the local Anangu. Vulnerable listed (NT) quandong (Santalum acuminatum) also occurs on Angas Downs, although they struggle against camel browsing.

Several species of native mammal including echidnas, Ooldea dunnart, lesser hairy-footed dunnart, kultarr, euro (eastern wallaroo), red kangaroo, Gould's wattled bat, lesser long-eared bat, spinifex hopping mouse, sandy inland mouse and dingos have been recorded on the Angas Downs Pastoral Lease. Also, fresh tracks and a burrow of a Dasycercus spp. likely to be the crest-tailed mulgara (Dasycercus cristicauda) were seen by Latz in July 2002. Remote infrared cameras also caught an endangered woma pythonon camera in a cave in the central sandstone hills – the Liddle Range – in Nov 2012.

Ninety-nine (99) species of birds have been recorded on Angas Downs. Emu, bustard (bush turkey) are important Tjukurpa and game species and mulga parrot, Major Mitchell's cockatoo, Australian ringneck, Bourke's parrot and budgerigar are common. Checklists are available for Angas Downs.

Other mammals have the potential to exist on Angas Downs and may be discovered with more extensive trapping and survey work to be undertaken on Angas Downs by volunteer scientists and the Angas Downs Indigenous rangers. With effective management of water and sustainable harvesting of populations of native wildlife, Angas Downs could become a significant location for conservation in central Australia. Rangers on Angas Downs are improving the environment to protect and increase important animals and plants using a combination of traditional knowledge and western science.

Pastoral history
Angas Downs Station was first taken up for pastoral purposes by William Liddle in 1927. He and his descendants, ran sheep and then cattle until the 1990s. As with many pastoral enterprises during the 1980s and 1990s, Angas Downs struggled financially and was eventually taken over by the mortgagee in 1994 before being purchased by the nearby Imanpa community. Since 1994, it has been owned by the Imanpa Development Association Inc., and managed by their company Lisanote Pty. Ltd. Descendants of William Liddle have living areas on the property.

Frederick GG Rose visited Angas Downs during July–October 1962 and documented the people and ways of life. He took specific interest in documenting the process of change in Aboriginal culture in context with contact with white civilisation. He also reported the genealogy of the Liddle family and other Aboriginals living on Angas Downs. More information on Aboriginal histories of Angas Downs can be found in Fred Rose's Book "The wind of change in central Australia: The Aborigines at Angas Downs, 1962".

In 2009, Angas Downs was declared an Indigenous Protected Area and remains a resource for members of the Imanpa Community, some of whom grew up and worked on Angas Downs.

The property still runs 300-400 head of cattle, restricted to a 266 km2 paddock in the southeast. Tourists can join tours to Angas Downs led by members of the Imanpa community to learn about the pastoral, cultural and natural history of the property.

Imanpa
Residents of Imanpa include Matuntara descendants (the original occupiers of Angas Downs region), Yankunytjatjara and Pitjantjatjara people. The Imanpa Development Association holds the lease for Angas Downs through its company Lisanote Pty Ltd.

Challenges
As for many remote Indigenous Communities in Australia, the Imanpa Community faces significant health, employment and educational challenges. Senior men and women say there is a breakdown in the old ways and that law and culture – the Tjukurpa is being lost. Land management activities restore the station environment and also improve the self-esteem and motivation of the Indigenous people by appealing to their aspiration to care for their country, and provide opportunities for training, employment and economic development. The Anangu elders, the Tjilpis and Myinkmaku, believe many social and health problems are the result of a breakdown in the old ways, and that implementation of Tjukurpa (Anangu customary knowledge) and restoring the land would help solve these problems. Piranpa (white fella science) and Tjukurpa can work together to do these things. It will make sure Tjukurpa and culture continue, and get children and grandchildren to learn about land. Looking after land is the key to Tjukurpa. Also more bush tucker means healthier food.

Anangu want to increase the amount of game animals like emu (Dromaius novaehollandiae), red kangaroo (Macropus rufus) and plant food like quandong (Santalum acuminatum). Anangu also want to bring back species that aren't in the land any more like rufous hare-wallaby and common brushtail possum.

Angas Downs Indigenous Protected Area Plan of Management
Through the support of the Australian Government's Caring for our Country, Working on Country and Indigenous Protected Areas programs, Anangu Rangers and the Imanpa community are restoring the landscape and protecting their cultural heritage using the Kuka Kanyini principles.

A plan of management was prepared by the members of the community with support from Australian Wildlife Services. It draws on traditional land management practices and sets out priorities for scientists and wildlife managers to work with Anangu from Imanpa to increase game, control ferals and protect cultural sites and the environment.

Objectives

To manage land and wildlife resources in order to maintain Anangu culture, conserve biodiversity and enable sustainable production in support of human communities and economic development.
In greater detail, the plan sets out how to:

 increase wildlife populations and estimate hunting yields
 identify wildlife refuge areas
 restore and protect water sources
 restore patch burning practices
 control feral animals and weeds
 exchange information across the region.

The plan outlines the significance of Angas Downs' biodiversity, the importance of its conservation and its contribution to the Imanpa Community. It details environment restoration and significantly, proposes development of a wildlife sanctuary and breeding facility and a tourist facility. It restricts cattle to a 250km2 zone to protect other more fragile and significant regions of Angas Downs.

"Ara nyangaku tjungurni Anangu-ku ara (Tjukurpa / Wapar) munu piran-ku (scientific) ara wirura Malu; Kalaya; Tinka munu Tjulpu tjuta-ku ngura, palyanyku atunymankunytjaku, nganampa ngura munu mai ngaranyangka uranma"
"Mixing Anangu customary knowledge – the Tjukurpa (law) with Piranpa (non-Anangu) scientific knowledge to improve wildlife habitat, enhance landscapes, and harvest species on a sustainable basis."

Benefits of indigenous involvement in land management
The benefit of Indigenous Australians working in land and wildlife management is well documented. Proactive Indigenous wildlife management combined with science can support sustainable harvesting, provide employment and income, create learning and training opportunities, improve Indigenous health (through exercise and diet) and reconnect them to the land and their cultural values, installing a sense of pride. Angas Downs Indigenous Protected Area aims to provide opportunities to Indigenous Australians to become involved in wildlife and land management and use their own knowledge to make decisions affecting their land. The IPA provides employment and income for theIndigenous community, creates learning
and training opportunities, and improves
health (through exercise and diet).

Angas Downs Anangu Rangers
Anangu Rangers employed by the Indigenous Protected Area and Working on Country program are putting in fences to keep ferals out, building a  wildlife sanctuary area, increasing watering points and cleaning water troughs to encourage more game species (red kangaroo, emu, perentie, goanna) and healthier landscapes. Angas Downs rangers are:
 Restoring and reactivating water sources
 Erecting feral animal exclusion fences (see Australian feral camel)
 Implementing feral animal eradication programs
 Controlling weeds and restoring native species
 Helping to increase native species, especially game species
 Monitoring wildlife and landscapes using Cybertracker
 Implementing patch burning
 Documenting bush tucker, medicine plants and cultural places
 Helping to start small scale tourism on Angas Downs
 Setting up breeding and holding facilities for emus
 Fencing and fire protection for rare plants such as Christmas tree mulga and quandong.

Small mammal and reptile surveys
Angas Downs Rangers conduct regular reptile and small mammal surveys across Angas Down's landscapes with scientists and volunteers using pitfall and funnel traps, and active searches. 51 reptile, 10 mammal (including one bat) and 4 frog species have been recorded to date. Simoselaps betholdi (Jan's banded snake), Suta punctata (little spotted snake), Demansia psammophis (yellow-faced whipsnake), Tiliqua multifasciata (Centralian blue-tongued skink), Ramphotyphlops endoterus (interior blind snake), Pygopus nigriceps (western hooded scaly-foot), woma, Nephrurus laevissimus, Nephrurus levis levis, Morethia ruficauda and Egernia inornata (desert skink) among others have been detected. Mammals detected included kultarr, Wongai ningaui, spinifex hopping mice, sandy inland mice and lesser hairy-footed dunnart.

Emu breeding on Angas Downs
Emu populations are very low on Angas Downs, as is the case in much of the Northern Territory. They are an important species to the local Anangu and traditional owners and to ecological processes. In combination with land management and control of feral animals, Anangu rangers will implement an emu breeding program to increase emus in the landscape. Local knowledge has suggested that emus may also increase the success of quandong (Santalum acuminatum) germination after the seed is eaten and has passed through the gut – this could be due to a combination of seed coat break down and being deposited in rich nutrient filled dung. They also help to disperse the seeds across the landscape. It is a goal of Angas Downs to increase bush tucker species such as quandong and will trial use of emus in quandong regeneration in coming years

In August 2010, Anangu Rangers took delivery of 20 emu chicks from an emu farm in WA. They were flown into Ayers Rock airport (Uluru) by Qantas and driven to the Angas Downs Indigenous Protected Area. After successful breeding, the emus will be released into a larger sanctuary area on Angas Downs. Angas Downs rangers also now own an egg incubator which will be used for increasing breeding success in following years.  The chicks and incubator were bought with donations provided by the Rotary Club of Canberra Burley Griffin. Progress of the emu chicks can be found here.

Aerial surveys of Angas Downs – camels, kangaroos and feral horse populations
Aerial surveys of the Angas Downs Indigenous Protected Area and surrounding lands were completed in June 2010. The survey was flown by Dr George Wilson using standard procedures for fixed-wing aircraft surveys. Indigenous observer, Brad Lander, and Jennifer Smits counted animals seen at low level and 200m on either side of the aircraft. Species targeted/observed included camels, kangaroos, horses, feral cattle, emus, euros, dingos and bustards (turkeys).

The study was vital to understanding populations of kangaroos and pressures from camel and horse populations on the property and hence native wildlife.

Using mapping program ArcGis 9.3, observations were interpolated to form maps showing spatial variability (animals/km2) of populations across the region. Estimated average density rates of kangaroos and camels across Angas Downs was 0.91 ± 0.16 and 0.24 ±0.07 per km2 respectively. It was noted that camel populations were largely dispersed due to recent high rainfall in central Australia (as at June 2010). Spatial variability of grazing pressures was also investigated.

Trial tours
Angas Downs is interested in development of small scale, tourism ventures. Angas Downs is on the main road to Uluru National Park and Watarrka National Park and has many thousands of visitors cross it each week.
Led by members of the Imanpa community, Australian Wildlife Services helped coordinate a few trial tour runs through the property including Rotary groups interested in culture, education and philanthropic activities and University/TAFE student groups interested in environment and wildlife. Angas Downs participated in a workshop called 'Stepping Stones' at the Imanpa community in May 2010 to help develop tourism on Angas Downs.

Support for Angas Downs
There is also potential for other benefactors to provide support, technical advice and training to the Anangu Rangers who are being employed to complete the work. The Rotary Club of Canberra Burley Griffin raised funds for installation of a solar pump to feed a trough for wildlife, 20 emu chicks for breeding and an emu egg incubator to raise emu chicks. The emus in captivity continue to be supported by the Rotary Club via funding for emu food.

International Wildlife Ranching Symposium, South Africa
Angas Downs' Indigenous Rangers were lucky to be sponsored to visit South Africa and attend the International Wildlife Ranching Symposium, South Africa in Kimberley in October 2011. The theme of the Symposium was – The business of conservation – science, livelihoods and values. Anangu Rangers benefited from an itinerary that enabled them to witness and be exposed to:
 intensive wildlife management including techniques for moving wildlife on game ranches
 Indigenous guides and rangers in national parks in private game reserves
 tourism and accommodation based on conservation of wildlife and land management.

Gallery

See also
 Protected areas of the Northern Territory

References

Indigenous Protected Areas of Australia
Protected areas of the Northern Territory
Indigenous Australian reserves
Stations (Australian agriculture)
Pastoral leases in the Northern Territory
Pitjantjatjara